John Joseph Murphy (May 13, 1849 – August 4, 1938) was a businessman and politician. He represented Harbour Main in the Newfoundland House of Assembly from 1908 to 1913 as a People's Party member.

Biography 
The son of James Murphy, a ship's captain, and Alice McDonald, he was born at Catalina and was educated at Saint Bonaventure's College. In 1869, he became manager of the Greenspond branch of the firm Ridley and Sons. From 1871 to 1876, Murphy operated his own fishery supply business. In 1876, he established a shipbuilding company and sawmill at Gambo. In 1893, he built a hotel in Gambo. He sold his sawmill and timber cutting rights to Newfoundland Timber Estates in 1904. By 1914, he had become majority share-holder for United Towns Electric Company; he was elected company president the following year. In 1919, he formed the Avalon Telephone Company. In 1932, he set up the Dominion Broadcasting Company and radio station VONF.

Murphy did not run for reelection to the Newfoundland assembly in 1913. However, he was named to the Legislative Council later that year and served there until 1934.

Murphy died in St. John's at the age of 89.

References 

1849 births
1938 deaths
Newfoundland People's Party MHAs
Members of the Legislative Council of Newfoundland
Dominion of Newfoundland politicians
People from Trinity Bay North